Cereophagus is a genus of moths of the family Crambidae. It contains only one species, Cereophagus futilalis, which is found in Argentina.

References

Glaphyriinae
Crambidae genera
Taxa named by Harrison Gray Dyar Jr.